Al-Quasim may refer to:

Al-Qassim Province, Saudi Arabia
Al-Qasim, Iraq
Al-Qasim (name)

See also

Abu al-Qasim, "father of Al-Quasim"
Ibn al-Qasim, "son of Al-Quasim"